Edward Burke (born 28 April 1870, date of death unknown) was a Jamaican cricketer. He played in two first-class matches for the Jamaican cricket team in 1894/95.

See also
 List of Jamaican representative cricketers

References

External links
 

1870 births
Year of death missing
Jamaican cricketers
Jamaica cricketers
Cricketers from Kingston, Jamaica